The 1928 Waterford Senior Hurling Championship was the 28th staging of the Waterford Senior Hurling Championship since its establishment by the Waterford County Board in 1897.

Erin's Own were the defending champions.

Erin's Own won the championship after a 5-06 to 2-00 defeat of Tallow in the final. This was their second championship title overall and their second title in succession.

References

Waterford Senior Hurling Championship
Waterford Senior Hurling Championship